Kroton, now Crotone, Italy, was an Achaean colony from  on the coast of the Gulf of Taranto.

Kroton may also refer to:
 The Krotons, a serial in the science fiction television series Doctor Who
 Kroton (Cyberman), character in the comic strips based on Doctor Who
 Kroton Educacional, a Brazilian private educational company

See also
Croton (disambiguation)